The John Green Sims House is a historic house in Wartrace, Tennessee, U.S..

History
The land belonged to Jerry Cleveland Sims. In 1884, Jerry's son, John Green Sims, and his wife Mary Wright, built this house on the land. It was inherited by their son, Lucius B. Sims, in 1944, who sold in 1965. In 1984, it was purchased by Kevin P. Wright.  It is now owned by Tracey L. DeWire, purchased in Feb, 2019.

Architectural significance
The house was designed in the Queen Anne architectural style, "with Eastlake detailing." It has been listed on the National Register of Historic Places since November 5, 1987.

References

Houses on the National Register of Historic Places in Tennessee
Queen Anne architecture in Tennessee
Houses completed in 1884
Buildings and structures in Bedford County, Tennessee